Gualdo may refer to several places in Italy:

 Gualdo (MC), in the Province of Macerata, Marche
 Gualdo Cattaneo, in the Province of Perugia, Umbria
 Gualdo Tadino, in the Province of Perugia, Umbria
 Gualdo, a frazione of Roncofreddo, Emilia-Romagna

Other 
S.S. Gualdo, an Italian football club based in Gualdo Tadino